Stone Park is a public park located in the center of Ashland, Massachusetts. 

The park contains a basketball court as well as two little league fields. The park hosts local soccer, baseball, and softball leagues.  In the summer there are free concerts held every Sunday and once a year Ashland Day is held there.

Ashland, Massachusetts
Parks in Middlesex County, Massachusetts